John William Schulten (1821–1875), also spelled Johann Wilhelm, was a 19th-century chess master from Germany and the United States. In the 1840s and 1850s, he traveled widely in Europe and the United States to play some of the best chess players in the world—Adolf Anderssen, Alexandre Deschapelles, Daniel Harrwitz, Bernhard Horwitz, Lionel Kieseritzky, Paul Morphy, Gustav Neumann, Jules Arnous de Rivière, Eugéne Rousseau, Pierre St. Amant, Charles Stanley, Von der Lasa, and Johannes Zukertort—losing to most of them. Although he lost matches against Kieseritzky and Morphy, he did beat both of them once. His only win against Morphy was in New York City in 1857:

Schulten has a chess opening variation named after him—the Schulten Defense to the Italian Game/Evans Gambit: 1.e4 e5 2.Nf3 Nc6 3.Bc4 Bc5 4.b4 Bxb4 5.c3 Ba5 6.d4 exd4 7.O-O b5.

References

External links
C51:Schulten Defense

1821 births
1875 deaths
German chess players
American chess players
19th-century chess players